Tobias Jonsson (born 29 February 1996) is a Swedish Paralympic athlete who competes in international track and field competitions, he competes in long jump and was a former sprinter. He is a World silver medalist and a two-time European silver medalist in the long jump.

Tobias is the younger brother of Per Jonsson, the brothers both competed at the 2012 and 2016 Summer Paralympics.

References

1996 births
Living people
People from Bollnäs
Paralympic athletes of Sweden
Swedish male sprinters
Swedish male long jumpers
Athletes (track and field) at the 2012 Summer Paralympics
Athletes (track and field) at the 2016 Summer Paralympics
Athletes (track and field) at the 2020 Summer Paralympics
Medalists at the World Para Athletics Championships
Medalists at the World Para Athletics European Championships
Visually impaired sprinters
Visually impaired long jumpers
Paralympic sprinters
Paralympic long jumpers
21st-century Swedish people